The Tbilisi Marriott Hotel is a luxury five-star Marriott hotel in Tbilisi, Georgia, located in 13 Rustaveli Avenue, the city's main boulevard. It was built as a high-class hotel on the commission of the wealthy Armenian merchant Mikael Aramyants from 1911 to 1915.

History 
The hotel, intended to become the best in Tbilisi, then capital of the Russian-ruled Georgia and the larger Caucasus region, was designed by Aleksandr Ozerov in 1911 and later remodeled by Gabriel Ter-Mikelov at the behest of Mikael Aramyants. Its construction was completed in 1915 and named Hôtel Majestic. During World War I, from 1915 to 1917, the hotel accommodated a military hospital before it could be opened for the public. After the Soviet takeover of Georgia in 1921, the building was transferred to the Trade Unions. Its ground floor was used for multiple purposes, housing a typography and shops, while a basement was turned into a cinema. In February 1939, the refurbished building was restored to its original function as Hotel Tbilisi run by the state-owned travel agency Intourist. Heavily damaged by fire during the December 1991–January 1992 coup d'etat, a prelude to the Georgian Civil War, it was reconstructed under the guidance of the architects G. Metreveli and V. Kurtishvili from 1995 to 2002. On 26 September 2002, the Tbilisi Marriott Hotel was opened in the building.

Architecture and facilities  
The hotel is a seven-story building, with five stories above ground. Its lavish façades retain their original design, utilizing elements of the Renaissance and Baroque architecture, such as rustification, massive semi-circular and flat pilasters with Corinthian capitals, and triangular and circular pediments rested upon stone brackets. Large columns accentuate the front entrance, facing Rustaveli Avenue. The main façade also contains a massive entablature and attic, with a moulded balustrade parapet.    

The hotel offers 116 rooms and 11 suites, including one vice-presidential and two presidential, as well as 9 conferences halls, lobby bar, restaurant, patio, a wellness centre for fitness, and other facilities.

References

External links

Official site

Hotels in Tbilisi
Marriott hotels
Rustaveli Avenue
Hotels established in 1915
Hotel buildings completed in 1915